Deh Baneh-ye Eslamabad (also Romanized as Deh Baneh-ye Eslāmābād; also known as De-Bane, Deh Baneh, and Deh Boneh) is a village in Eslamabad Rural District, Sangar District, Rasht County, Gilan Province, Iran. At the 2006 census, its population was 3,625, in 998 families.

References 

Populated places in Rasht County